Edward M. Esber, Jr. (born 1952) is semi-retired in Park City, Utah.  Ed spends his time helping the State of Utah, Utah Law enforcement and the Silicon Slopes entrepreneur community in Utah.

Summary
As a PC industry veteran, he pioneered the marketing and distribution of personal computer productivity software.  Afterwards, he did seminal work on the integration of computers and multimedia; the integration of computers, toys and learning; the integration of computers, communication and telephony; the mobilization of email and internet access and personal computer mobility. He served on the boards of companies that introduced the first hard disk add on card for PCs, the first MP3 player, the first DVR and the first tablet computer.

Education
Esber graduated with a BS computer engineering degree from Case Institute of Technology in 1974.  He later earned a MS in electrical engineering from Syracuse University while working with IBM in 1976.  He then went on to earn an MBA from Harvard Business School, in 1978.

Early life and career
Esber was born in Cleveland, Ohio, the oldest of eight children.

He worked as an engineer/programmer in IBM's System Product Division and in product marketing at Texas Instruments Personal Computer and Consumer Products Division.

In 1979, Dan Flystra recruited Esber to run worldwide sales and marketing for Person Software (later renamed VisiCorp). While there, he helped manage distribution of the first micro-software program, Visicalc.  VisiCalc was credited with sparking the explosive growth of Apple Computer and the beginning of the Personal Computer Software revolution.

Ashton Tate
Esber took over Ashton Tate in 1985. During his time as CEO, Ashton-Tate acquired several companies, including Decision Resources and MultiMate.  Ashton-Tate grew from $40 million in revenue to over $300 million during his tenure.

While at Ashton-Tate, Esber had several strategic merger discussions with the likes of Lotus and Microsoft which were all rejected by a strategically inept board.  Ultimately, he initiated the company's sale to Borland.

In May 1990, he stepped down as Chairman over disagreements on strategy, mergers and acquisitions with the board.

Creative Labs
In 1994, he was appointed CEO of Creative Labs.

Creative Insights/SoloPoint
Esber was a founder and CEO of a Computer Toys company called Creative Insights and the CEO of SoloPoint, a telephony products company.

Angel investment/venture capital
Esber was a founding member in 1997 of The Angels Forum, a professional, Silicon Valley based group of angel investors. He also is a member of the management team of The Halo Funds.

Current endeavors
Esber is currently helping the State of Utah continue its explosive growth by serving on the Utah Capital Investment Corporation, the Utah Technology Initiative Advisory Board and past member of the Utah Small Business Growth Initiative Board.  He also serves as the Chairman of the Utah 1033 Foundation which provides financial support for the families of Utah law enforcement officers killed in the line of duty and the Summit County Sheriff's Citizen's Advisory Board.

Honors and awards
BusinessWeek, "25 Executives to Watch,” April 15, 1988.
Computer Reseller News, 1985&1986, "Industry's 25 Most Influential Execs."
Esquire Magazine, 1986 Register Honoree, Business and Industry.
So Ca Executive, "The Southland's 100 Outstanding Leaders in 1986."

Boards
Esber currently sits on the boards of PanTerra Networks and is co-chair of the emeriti trustee committee of Case Western Reserve University.  In the past Esber has served on the boards of Activision, Ashton Tate, Quantum Corporation, SONICblue. Pansophic Systems, Integrated Circuits System Technology and many private companies.

References

External links
 Software History Museum Oral History
 Ed Esber's Website

1952 births
Living people
American computer businesspeople
Businesspeople in software
Case Western Reserve University alumni
Syracuse University alumni
Harvard Business School alumni